Tomorrow Never Knows is the second solo album from Peter Baldrachi.  The record features many of the same musicians as Solid Ground including both Gary Rand and Alice Austin.  Other notable guests appearing on the record include Ian McLagan (Faces, The Rolling Stones, Billy Bragg) and singer/songwriter Amy Rigby.
  The album appeared on several end-of-the-year lists including Power Pop Action’s 100 Favorite Albums of the Year (#5), The Pure Pop Pub’s Top 15 For 2011 (#8), Power Pop Station’s Top 50 Albums (#12), Powerpopaholic’s Top 25 Power Pop Albums of 2011 (#25), and Absolute Power Pop’s Top 75 (#40).''

Track listing

Personnel
 Peter Baldrachi – lead vocals, drums, percussion, piano, backing vocals
 Gary Rand – electric & acoustic guitars, lead guitar, bass, vibes, piano, backing vocals
 Dave Lieb – piano, Wurlitzer and Hammond B3
 Alice Austin – backing vocals (tracks 4, 6, 9, 11)
 Amy Fairchild – backing vocals (tracks 1, 2, 5, 7, 8)
 Ian McLagan – Wurlitzer and Hammond B3 on “Now For Good”
 Amy Rigby – vocals on “Promise Me A New Start”
 Ian Kennedy – mandolin and violin on “Pick Up The Pieces”
 Aristides Rivas – cello on “Lose It All” and “Release Me”

Production notes
 Recorded at Kissy Pig Studios, Allston, MA May 2009-June 2011
 Engineered by K.R. Mogenson
 Mixed by Paul Q. Kolderie
 Mastered by Ian Kennedy at New Alliance East, Cambridge, MA
 Edited by Corbin Smith

References

2011 albums
Peter Baldrachi albums